Kotha Janta is a 2014 Indian Telugu-language romantic comedy drama film directed by Maruthi and produced by Bunny Vasu through Geetha Arts Banner. It stars Allu Sirish and Regina Cassandra in the lead roles. The film released on 1 May 2014 to mixed reviews from critics.

Plot

Sirish (Allu Sirish) is a selfish guy and does anything for money. Suvarna (Regina Cassandra) is a practical girl who is fond of making money. Both of them are summoned to work together in a TV channel in Hyderabad. Their target is to take that sinking channel to the top. They start a new program called Kotha Janta where they marry off couples who are caught in strange situations. After marrying off the first couple, they realise that the girl belongs to a powerful politician’s family. Sirish and Suvarna start having differences as the politician chase them. The rest of the story is all about how they realize that they are made for each other.

Cast 

 Allu Sirish as Sirish
 Regina Cassandra as Suvarna
 Madhunandan as Madhu
 Nyra Banerjee as Pentamma
 Saptagiri as Giri
 Saikumar Pampana as Sai
 Posani Krishna Murali
 Rao Ramesh as Y TV Chairman Ramesh
 Sundaram Master as Suvarna's grandfather
 Y. Kasi Viswanath as Suvarna's father
 Rohini as Sirish's mother
 Sruthi as Bebakka
 Ahuti Prasad as Politician
 Prabhas Sreenu
 Josh Ravi as Ravi
 Satyam Rajesh as background dancer

Production 
The film was launched in Hyderabad on 30 May 2013. Chiranjeevi gave the clap and D. Ramanaidu switched on the camera for the first shot. In November 2013 a song, the remixed version of the Chiranjeevi's, Atu Amalapuram, from the film, Khaidi No.786, was filmed on Sirish and Madhurima, at a specially erected set in a private studio.

Soundtrack
The music was composed by Jeevan Babu and released under Aditya Music.

References

External links
 

2010s Telugu-language films
2014 films
Geetha Arts films
Films directed by Maruthi
2014 romantic comedy-drama films
Indian romantic comedy-drama films
Films set in Hyderabad, India
Films shot in Hyderabad, India